Francis Groves (1623–1661)  was a seventeenth century publisher based at Snow Hill, London.

He is recorded by Plomer as:

Publications

 illustrated by Peter Stent.

References

1623 births
1661 deaths
Publishers (people) from London
History of printing